KWXS (107.7 FM) is a commercial Top 40 (CHR) station in Prineville, Oregon, serving the Bend, Oregon area. The station is owned by Combined Communications and signed on the air with rhythmic contemporary as "Wild 107.7" on April 4, 2012.

It has been granted a Federal Communications Commission (FCC) construction permit to increase ERP to 2,500 watts.

On January 5, 2015, KWXS shifted their format to Top 40 (CHR), branded as "107.7 The Beat".

References

External links
Official Website

FCC construction permit

Contemporary hit radio stations in the United States
WXS
Radio stations established in 2012
2012 establishments in Oregon